Francesco Fedato (born 15 October 1992) is an Italian footballer who plays as a left winger for  club Vis Pesaro.	

He previously played for Venezia, Lucchese, Bari, Catania and Modena.

Career
Fedato began his career as a youth player of Venezia.

Bari
Catania signed Fedato for free.

Fedato made his first team debut at Bari as a substitute in a 2–1 win against Pro Vercelli on 25 September 2012. In his debut season, he scored 6 goals in 26 league matches for Bari. On 19 June 2013 the co-ownership was renewed.

Sampdoria
On 31 January 2014, Serie A side Sampdoria bought Fedato from Bari for €900,000 on -year contract, while Catania retained 50% of the registration rights. Fedato also returned to Catania for the rest of 2013–14 Serie A in a temporary deal. Fedato received a call-up from Bari on the day he left for Sampdoria/Catania.

On 18 June 2014 the co-ownership deal was renewed. On 30 June 2014 he received a call-up to the pre-retreat camp of Sampdoria. On 8 January 2015 Fedato was signed by Serie B club Modena in a temporary deal. On 25 June 2015 Sampdoria purchased the remaining 50% of the registration rights of Fedato from Catania.

On 21 July 2015 he was signed by Livorno in a temporary deal.

Foggia

Loan to Trapani
On 9 January 2019, he joined Trapani on loan.

Serie C clubs
On 19 September 2019 he signed with Gozzano.

On 5 October 2020 he joined Casertana on a two-year contract.

On 29 January 2021 he moved to Gubbio. On 31 August 2021 he returned to Lucchese on loan.

On 4 August 2022, Fedato signed with Vis Pesaro for one year, with an option to extend.

References

External links
 Lega Serie B profile 
 

1992 births
Living people
People from Mirano
Sportspeople from the Metropolitan City of Venice
Italian footballers
Association football forwards
Serie A players
Serie B players
Serie C players
Serie D players
S.S.C. Bari players
U.C. Sampdoria players
Catania S.S.D. players
Modena F.C. players
U.S. Livorno 1915 players
A.C. Carpi players
Calcio Foggia 1920 players
Piacenza Calcio 1919 players
Trapani Calcio players
A.C. Gozzano players
Casertana F.C. players
A.S. Gubbio 1910 players
Lucchese 1905 players
Vis Pesaro dal 1898 players
Italy youth international footballers
Italy under-21 international footballers
Footballers from Veneto